You Scare Me to Death is a posthumous album credited to Marc Bolan of T. Rex. Released in 1981 by record label Cherry Red, it is first LP of material released after his death in 1977.

Content 

The album consists of outtakes and demos recorded by Bolan in 1966. Some of the songs would later be recorded by Bolan's band, Tyrannosaurus Rex. Most of these tracks have also been released in their original form on the album, The Beginning of Doves (1974). In 1981, backing instrumentals were recorded and added to Bolan's original recordings.

Release 

You Scare Me to Death was released in 1981 by record label Cherry Red. The album reached No. 88 on the UK Albums Chart. The title track was originally called "Horrible Breath" and was written as a proposed television jingle for Amplex tablets.

Track listing

Personnel 

 Marc Bolan – vocals, acoustic guitar

 1981 instrumentals

 Brian Odgers – bass guitar 
 Graham Jarvis – drums 
 Bernie Holland – guitar 
 Graham Todd – piano
 Dyan Birch – backing vocals
 Frank Collins – backing vocals
 Paddy McHugh – backing vocals

References 

T. Rex (band) albums
1982 albums
Albums published posthumously